The British Antarctic explorer Robert Falcon Scott became the subject of controversy when, more than 60 years after his death on the return march from the South Pole in 1912, his achievements and character came under sustained attack. Until that time the image of Scott, in Britain and in much of the world, had been that of heroic endeavour, the cornerstone of his reputation being his "Message to the Public" written just before his death. Occasional muted criticisms of his methods and character had generally failed to penetrate the public's consciousness. However, Roland Huntford's 1979 joint biography of Scott and his rival Roald Amundsen presented a contrasting view of Scott, not as hero but as heroic bungler. The book was reissued in the 1980s as The Last Place on Earth, and was the subject of a 1985 television serial The Last Place on Earth.

Although Huntford's objectivity was questioned, and despite the hostility of the descendants of Scott and his comrades, the book and the related television drama changed the public's perception, the "bungler" tag quickly becoming the new orthodoxy. In the 1980s and 1990s Scott was depicted negatively in further books, was satirised and finally subjected to ridicule. As Scott's reputation declined, that of his contemporary Ernest Shackleton, long overshadowed by Scott, was in the ascendent as his man-management skills were celebrated, particularly in the United States, as models for business leaders. Historians have argued that the changing attitudes toward Scott arose not merely from Huntford's analysis but from late 20th century cultural shifts which would in any event have questioned the traditional forms of heroism represented by Scott.

The first decade of the 21st century has seen specific attempts to rescue Scott's reputation. Analysis of March 1912 meteorological data has been used to suggest that Scott and his party might have been primarily the victims of unusually severe Antarctic weather rather than of bungling and incompetence. A 2003 Scott biography by polar explorer Sir Ranulph Fiennes included a spirited defence of Scott, and was the first book to mount a serious attack on Huntford's thesis and credentials. Other biographical and historical works, television programmes and numerous articles have continued to appear, representing different areas of the controversy's spectrum. According to historian Stephanie Barczewski, the variations in Scott's reputation are the result of current cultural forces that have very little to do with Scott himself.

Finally, in 2012, Karen May at the Scott Polar Research Institute re-discovered the following facts. In 1921, Edward Evans revealed in his book South with Scott that Scott had left the following written orders at Cape Evans dated 20 October 1911 to secure Scott's speedy return from the pole using dogs. This order, rediscovered in 2012, was not carried out after Scott had indicated this was not of the highest priority, and Scott and his men died:

Expedition member Apsley Cherry-Garrard initially omitted mentioning Scott's order in his 1922 book The Worst Journey in the World. However, in the 1948 preface to his book, also rediscovered in 2012, he admits to the existence of Scott's order, and explains that Scott's order could not have been carried out because insufficient dog food had been laid out (this was Cecil Meares's responsibility, being the dog-driver and the recipient of Scott's order) and because one of the base camp team, Atkinson, was too exhausted at the specified time of departure.

Background 
Robert Falcon Scott and four companions reached the South Pole on 17 January 1912, to find that they had been forestalled by a Norwegian party led by Roald Amundsen, who had arrived at the Pole five weeks earlier. Scott's party perished during their return journey to base camp in McMurdo Sound, their bodies and records being recovered by a search party during the following season.

Scott's journals told the story of the march in terms which had a great public impact, elevating him to the role of iconic hero, with few searching questions asked about the causes of the disaster. Scott's assertion in his final Message to the Public, that his party's fate was the result of misfortune, not faulty organisation, was generally accepted without question; accounts of Scott's last expedition contained only limited and muted criticisms. This broadly remained the case for the following sixty years.

Reassessment

Early criticism 
Apsley Cherry-Garrard's 1922 book The Worst Journey in the World mentions mistakes, and includes descriptions of Scott's character as "weak" and "peevish",  but still praises his heroism and concludes that he was "the last of the great geographical explorers". Reflecting many years later in the 1940s, Cherry-Garrard privately resented Scott and his decision to take the dogs further than the original plan. "Here was Scott, with a tremendous urge to carry out his depot and polar journeys. He depended on ponies and manhauling. What was it in Scott that which prevented him from having good ponies and good manhaulers? Somewhere it is his own weakness....his bad ponies and bad manhaulers led to inevitable strains on himself and others." In 1927, amateur historian John Gordon Hayes published Antarctica: A treatise on the Southern Continent, in which he concludes that Scott's over-complex transport arrangements had contributed to a disaster that could otherwise have been prevented, but this revelation had little public effect.

Subsequent books and films continued to reinforce Scott's heroic reputation, up to and beyond World War II. Reginald Pound (1966) and Elspeth Huxley (1977), who each had access to original material including Scott's sledging journals, both produced full-length biographies which identify personal weaknesses but endorse Scott's heroism. The first major book written from a perspective that clearly rejects the traditional reverential approach to Scott was David Thomson's Scott's Men (1977): "Scott does not strike me as a great man – at least, not until near the end".

Huntford 
Two years later Roland Huntford published Scott and Amundsen, claiming that his primary motive was the righting of an historic wrong – the elevation of Scott to heroic status despite his failures, and the neglect of the successful Amundsen. The book, a sustained attack on Scott, has been described as "devastating" and "at best one-sided, at worst as wholly malicious"; in general it was an "anti-historical" approach to the debate.

It did, however, become a best-seller on both sides of the Atlantic, having an immediate negative impact on public perceptions of Scott, described by Huntford as "one of the worst of polar explorers". The new orthodoxy was that Scott, far from being a hero, was a "heroic bungler". The ready acceptance of this view of Scott has been attributed to the unavoidable reality of Britain's national decline, and recognition of Scott as "an emblem of the amateurism and incompetence which ... had encumbered Britain through the twentieth century."

Grounds for criticism 
Among the main criticisms levelled by Huntford and others against Scott are:
 Failure to organise an effective transport strategy, and in particular the failure to regard prior advice about the vital importance of dogs on polar journeys
 Faulty judgment of character and/or ability, as in his alleged "favouritism" and supposed emotional attachment to Edgar Evans, again against advice
 Disruption of the logistics of the polar march by adding a fifth man—Bowers—to the party which made the final dash to the Pole
 Giving inconsistent and contradictory orders about the use of dogs in the organisation of any attempt to relieve the polar party on its return journey, with the result that no effective relief attempt was made
 Specific organisational failures including mismanagement of the depot-laying, resulting in the placement of One Ton Depot too far to the north; the insistence on collecting geological specimens when the returning polar party was fighting for its life; putting at risk key members of the polar team—Wilson and Bowers—in allowing them to participate in the hazardous Winter Journey shortly before the polar march
 General faults of character: being aloof, self-absorbed, over-sentimental, inflexible and obtuse

Counter-revision 
In 1997, Diana Preston published A First-Rate Tragedy: Robert Falcon Scott and the Race to the South Pole, a documentation of Scott's expeditions. While she admits some of Scott's weaknesses such as his short temper and jumpy style of decision-making, she also gives mitigating aspects to every questionable event. The book however received little attention and has gone out of print.

In the first decade of the 21st century, attempts to rescue Scott's reputation were led by polar explorer and adventurer Sir Ranulph Fiennes, with his 2003 biography Captain Scott. The book has been noted not only for its defence of Scott but for the stridency of its attacks on Huntford, which Fiennes claimed would have gone considerably further, had the laws of libel allowed. Fiennes, who has apparently studied how the great explorers of his own generation came to be sidelined, later described Scott as "a great historic hero whose name has been dragged through the dirt."

Susan Solomon's summary of meteorological data for the Ross Ice Shelf during February and March 1912 advances the theory that the death of Scott's party was due to the extreme weather conditions that prevailed at that time, rather than to organisational failure. This conclusion is generally supported by David Crane in his 2005 biography, although faults are acknowledged.

Manchester historian Max Jones argues that the fall in Scott's public standing arose primarily from Huntford's successful depiction of Scott as "an emblem for the amateurism and incompetence which ... had encumbered Britain through the twentieth century." He concludes, however, that "raising Scott as an emblem of decline reveals more about current concerns than about past history." Jones further notes the "rediscovery" of Ernest Shackleton during the 1990s and that "Scott has been sacrificed on the altar of Shackleton worship", themes which are the main substance of Stephanie Barczewski's 2008 book Antarctic Destinies. Barczewski also advances the view that late 20th century cultural shifts would inevitably have caused reassessment of the traditional forms of heroism represented by Scott.

References

Bibliography 

 
 
 
 
 
 
 
 
 
 
 
 

Scott, Robert Falcon
Heroic Age of Antarctic Exploration
Robert Falcon Scott
Terra Nova expedition